Lekan Osifeso Jnr. (born  28 April 1996) popularly known as Lojay, is a Nigerian musician, singer, songwriter and performing artist. He peaked at number 8 on the billboard U.S. afrobeats songs chart with his song Monalisa, in which he features Chris Brown and Sarz. His song is also the most played afrobeats song on Shazam according to Cool FM Nigeria and NotJustOk. He was nominated for The Headies award for next rated artiste for the year 2022.

Early life and background 
He graduated from the University of Portsmouth, UK in 2018. His family lived in Ikorodu and then in Victoria Island. As his mother was a pastor, Osifeso went to church regularly, as a family routine during his formative years. While growing up, Chris Brown was one of his favorite singers.

Career 

Lojay's stage name is an abbreviation of the first letters of his full name "Lekan Osifeso Junior" (LO-J). He picked interest in music and singing as an adolescent. And pursued his passion through his teenage years. He is fluid with the genre of music he does and switches from one gnere to the other. In an interview with Nataal, he said 

He started music professionally in 2016 on a part-time basis while he was still an undergraduate and then went on to focus solely on music after obtaining his degree. In December 2017, Lojay released his debut EP, Midnight Vibes, which consisted of five tracks. The titles of the tracks from the EP are Atarodo, Alomo, Kele, 10K Splaw and  Whine & Bubble.

In 2019, he released the single Ariel and in 2020 he released another single titled Ogogoro. Between his initial sojourn into the music industry in 2016 and the release of his breakout songs in 2021, Lojay dropped several singles including Along, Kuli Kuli, Over the Bar amongst others.

In May 2021, his sophomore EP titled LV N ATTN (stylized from Love and Attention), which was a duet EP alongside producer Sarz, was released. It was a five track EP that contained his breakout singles which he released earlier that year titled Tonongo and Monalisa, a song he went on to remix with Chris Brown. As well as LV N ATTN, a track with the same name as the EP, in which he featured Wizkid. The two other tracks are titled Panty! and Park  O X3. The body of work earned a nomination for The Headies award for next rated artiste for the year 2021/2022. In November 2021, he and Zlatan Ibile were featured by DJ Neptune on the song titled Only fan.

In 2022, he took part in the Heineken UEFA Champions League trophy tour in Nigeria.

In March 2023, Lojay released his second solo EP titled Gangster Romantic. According to Bomi Anifowose from African Folder, the EP is polarized by Lojay's impressive vocal octaves, songwriting prowess, witty lambas, and a lot of giddy instrumentation that makes it a very worthy listen.

Discography

EP

Awards and nominations

References 

Living people
Musicians from Lagos State
Nigerian male singer-songwriters
Nigerian male pop singers
Nigerian hip hop singers
English-language singers from Nigeria
Yoruba-language singers
Nigerian music industry executives
21st-century Nigerian male singers
1996 births